Enoch Kofi Adu (born 14 September 1990) is a Ghanaian professional footballer who plays as a midfielder for Allsvenskan club Mjällby AIF.

Club career

Early career and Nice 
Born in Kumasi, Ghana, Adu started his professional career in 2006 at local club Liberty Professionals F.C. On 23 September 2008, he moved from Liberty Professionals to French Ligue 1 club OGC Nice and signed a contract extending to 2011. He completed the move with national teammate Abeiku Quansah. On 26 March 2010, Adu went for a trial at Swedish club GAIS. Adu later signed a contract with Danish Superliga club FC Nordsjælland on 16 July 2010.

FC Nordsjælland 
Adu quickly became an important player for FC Nordsjælland as he took a permanent position in the starting eleven. He played continuously in the league, cup and European competitions at his first season at the club. Adu was part of the Nordsjælland squad that won the Danish Cup during the 2010–11 season, also participating in the final of the competition. Adu continued to be an important player for the club as they won their first league title in the 2011–12 season. Subsequently, the club qualified for the 2012–13 UEFA Champions League where Adu participated in all six group stage matches when Nordsjælland finished last in their group. Halfway through the 2012–13 season Adu transferred from Nordsjælland to Belgian Pro League club Club Brugge.

Club Brugge 
After transferring to Belgium Adu played fairly regularly during the remainder of the 2012–13 season. However, during his second season at the club he played less regularly and was loaned to Norwegian newly promoted Tippeligaen club Stabæk until the summer of 2014.

Malmö FF 
On 8 July 2014 reigning Swedish champions Malmö FF announced that they had signed Adu from Club Brugge as reinforcement for the club's campaign to qualify for the 2014–15 UEFA Champions League. The transfer was originally meant to be carried out on 1 August when Adu's loan contract with Stabæk ran out, however Malmö FF has confirmed that they were in negotiations with Stabæk to acquire Adu when the Swedish transfer window opened on 15 July. At the same time it was also confirmed that Adu would wear the number 8 shirt at the club. On 24 July Stabæk announced that they had agreed to terminate the loan deal prematurely for a minor compensation from Malmö FF. Adu made 15 appearances for Malmö FF during the latter part of the 2014 season, helping the club defend their league title and qualify for the group stage of the 2014–15 UEFA Champions League. Adu was a regular in the next Champions League campaign in 2015–16 as Malmö FF once again qualified for the group stage.

AIK 
On 25 October 2017, Adu joined Swedish club AIK on a three-year contract from Akhisar Belediyespor.

International career 
Adu represented the Ghana national under-17 team at the 2007 FIFA U-17 World Cup held in Korea Republic and played six matches in the tournament. Adu was called up to the senior Ghana side for a 2018 FIFA World Cup qualifier against Uganda in October 2016. He made his international debut in a friendly game against South Africa on 11 October 2016.

Career statistics

Honours
FC Nordsjælland
 Danish Cup: 2010–11
 Danish Superliga: 2011–12

Malmö FF
 Allsvenskan: 2014, 2016
 Svenska Supercupen: 2014

AIK
 Allsvenskan: 2018

References

External links
  
 
 

1990 births
Living people
Footballers from Kumasi
Ghanaian footballers
Association football midfielders
Ghana international footballers
Liberty Professionals F.C. players
OGC Nice players
FC Nordsjælland players
Club Brugge KV players
Stabæk Fotball players
Malmö FF players
Akhisarspor footballers
AIK Fotboll players
Danish Superliga players
Belgian Pro League players
Eliteserien players
Allsvenskan players
Süper Lig players
Ghanaian expatriate footballers
Ghanaian expatriate sportspeople in France
Expatriate footballers in France
Ghanaian expatriate sportspeople in Denmark
Expatriate men's footballers in Denmark
Ghanaian expatriate sportspeople in Belgium
Expatriate footballers in Belgium
Ghanaian expatriate sportspeople in Norway
Expatriate footballers in Norway
Ghanaian expatriate sportspeople in Sweden
Expatriate footballers in Sweden
Ghanaian expatriate sportspeople in Turkey
Expatriate footballers in Turkey